Rhodacarella is a genus of mites in the family Rhodacaridae.

Species
 Rhodacarella cavernicola Moraza, 2004

References

Mesostigmata